"Forgiveness" is the 30th single released by Ayumi Hamasaki, and her 17th number one. It came out on August 20, 2003. Though "Forgiveness" reached No. 1 on the Oricon charts, its total sales were disappointing, selling only 220,000 copies, 370,000 less than Hamasaki's previous single, "&", which sold 590,000 copies. It was used as the drama Kōgen e Irasshai's theme song.

Track listing
 "Forgiveness" – 5:53
 "Ourselves" (Kentaro Takizawa Remix)
 "Hanabi ~Episode II~" (HAL's Mix 2003)
 "Forgiveness" (Instrumental) – 5:53

Chart positions

Charts
Oricon Sales Chart (Japan)

  Total Sales :  260,000 (Japan)
 RIAJ certification: Platinum

References

External links
 forgiveness information at Avex Network.
 forgiveness information at Oricon.

Ayumi Hamasaki songs
2003 singles
Oricon Weekly number-one singles
Songs written by Ayumi Hamasaki
Songs written by Dai Nagao
Japanese television drama theme songs
Song recordings produced by Max Matsuura
2003 songs
Avex Trax singles